InfraKit is an open-source project that is part of the larger Docker application container software project. The project was formally announced for Docker by its creator Solomon Hykes at the Linuxcon EU 2016 event. InfraKit was originally called 'libmachete' and was renamed by Docker developers in October 2016.

According to the project's GitHub description, InfraKit is a toolkit for creating and managing declarative, self-healing infrastructure. InfraKit consists of several core elements which include, instances, groups and flavors. Groups are collections of instances while flavors are specific groups built for a certain purpose. The InfraKit model works as a set of plugins that can be used to monitor Docker infrastructure. In the event of a failure or a node falling out of a set policy, the self-healing element of InfraKit enables remediation.

References

External links
 Docker Debuts Infrakit Open Source Toolkit for Self-Healing Infrastructure 
 Introducing InfraKit, an open source toolkit for creating and managing declarative, self-healing infrastructure
 Docker emits InfraKit to wrangle containers on competing clouds

Free software